"Feelings" is a song by American singer and songwriter Lauv. It was released on September 19, 2019, as the fifth single from his debut studio album How I'm Feeling.

Composition and lyrics
"Feelings" is a song about unrequited love in which Lauv "[is] asking a girl if she wants to cross the line and take their feelings to the next level".

Credits and personnel
Credits adapted from Tidal.
Lauv – vocals, songwriter, producer
Johnny Simpson – songwriter, producer
Andrea Rosario – songwriter
Michael Pollack – songwriter

Charts

Certifications

Release history

References

2019 singles
2019 songs
Lauv songs
Songs written by Michael Pollack (musician)
Songs written by Lauv